The Roman Catholic Diocese of Puerto Plata (erected 16 December 1996) is a suffragan diocese of the Archdiocese of Santiago de los Caballeros. The diocese is located in the province of Puerto Plata, in the northern section of the Dominican Republic.
The cathedral of the diocese is the Cathedral of St. Philip the Apostle, which is located in the city of San Felipe de Puerto Plata,

Bishops

Ordinaries (Bishops of the Diocese)
Gregorio Nicanor Peña Rodríguez (1996 - 2004), appointed Bishop of Nuestra Señora de la Altagracia en Higüey
Julio César Corniel Amaro (2005 - )

Other priest of this diocese who became bishop
Santiago Rodríguez Rodríguez, appointed Bishop of San Pedro de Macorís in 2017

External links and references

Puerto Plata
Puerto Plata
Puerto Plata
Puerto Plata, Roman Catholic Diocese of